Mickey Finn or Micky Finn may refer to:
 Mickey Finn (drugs), a drug-laced drink
 Mickey Finn (comic strip), a long-running comic strip
 Mickey Finn (drummer) (1947–2003), British drummer and former member of T. Rex
 Micky Finn (footballer) (born 1954), English former football goalkeeper
 Mickey Finn (guitarist) (1947–2013), British rock guitarist
 Mickey Finn (inventor) (1938–2007), American inventor of military systems and sports equipment
 Mickey Finn (Irish fiddler) (1951–1987), Irish fiddler
 Mickie Finn's, nightclub and TV show (sometimes written Mickey Finn's)
 Mickey Finn (fiction), a fictional character and pseudonym of the 19th century writer Ernest Jarrold

See also
 Michael Flynn (disambiguation)
 Mike Fink (1770–1823), historical figure, in the folklore of the Ohio River keel boatmen
 Michael Finn (born 1970), an American politician